Cryptophis is a genus of venomous snakes in the family Elapidae. The genus is native to Australia and New Guinea.

Species
The following five species are recognized as being valid.
Cryptophis boschmai 
Cryptophis incredibilis 
Cryptophis nigrescens 
Cryptophis nigrostriatus 
Cryptophis pallidiceps 

Nota bene: A binomial authority in parentheses indicates that the species was originally described in a genus other than Cryptophis.

Etymology
The specific name, boschmai, is in honor of Dutch zoologist Hilbrand Boschma.

References

Further reading
Worrell E (1961). "Herpetological Name Changes". West Australian Naturalist 8: 18–27. (Cryptophis, new genus).

 
Snake genera